Mokotjomela is a community council located in the Quthing District of Lesotho. Its population in 2006 was 12,340.

Villages
The community of Mokotjomela includes the villages of: 
 
 Aupolasi
 Ha Buru
 Ha Chere
 Ha Khatoane
 Ha Koali
 Ha Leroma
 Ha Lerotholi
 Ha Lethinya
 Ha Mabala
 Ha Malibe
 Ha Mathatjane
 Ha Mofula
 Ha Mohlakaso
 Ha Mohlori
 Ha Mokae
 Ha Mokokoane
 Ha Moleleki
 Ha Moone
 Ha Moqalo
 Ha Mpheelle
 Ha Mphethi
 Ha Muso
 Ha Ntemere
 Ha Ponto
 Ha Seja-Meloli
 Ha Sekhele
 Ha Sekhonyana
 Ha Tebesi
 Khohlong (Ha Koali)
 Lefikeng
 Lekhalong
 Lipeleng
 Liphakoeng
 Majakaneng
 Makong (Lefikeng)
 Makoreng
 Makorong
 Maloikomong
 Malothoaneng
 Mangoseng
 Mantsoepa
 Mapekeng
 Mapekeng (Mabankoleng)
 Mapekeng (Phokeng)
 Mapekeng (Tšieng)
 Maputsoe
 Maqoathong
 Marakong
 Maralleng
 Matsitsing
 Matsoapong
 Meeling
 Meeling (Lefikeng)
 Mehlehleng
 Mokotjomela
 Mothating
 Naleli (Lefikeng)
 Nqanqasing
 Phahameng
 Phuthing
 Polasing
 Polateng
 Sekhutlong
 Sekolong
 Seleng
 Sephokong
 Thang Block
 Thepung
 Tholong
 Thoteng
 Tiping
 Tlhakoaneng
 Tlokoeng
 Tsekong
 Tsoelike

References

External links
 Google map of community villages

Populated places in Quthing District